Goygol District is one of the 66 districts of Azerbaijan. It is located in the west of the country and belongs to the Ganja-Dashkasan Economic Region. The district borders the districts of Goranboy, Kalbajar, Dashkasan, Shamkir, Samukh, and the city of Ganja. Its capital and largest city is Goygol. As of 2020, the district had a population of 64,600.

History 

Formerly known as Khanlar, the region was renamed "Göygöl" after Lake Göygöl, the famous blue lake, by the decision of the Parliament of Azerbaijan on April 25, 2008.

The administrative centre of the district, Goygol city was established in 1819 by German settlers who came from Kingdom of Württemberg and was called Helenendorf. Houses were built in German style, streets were laid down, a school, a kindergarten and a music school were established. The main building of the current Agrarian Industry Plant was constructed as a winery by the Fohrer brothers who were dealing with wine and cognac production there.

In the area of Goygol district, Narimanov district was established in August 1930 of which centre was Helenendorf. Narimanov district was renamed Khanlar district and its centre Helenendorf was called Khanlar city since November 1938. The territory of the district was divided into 2 districts - Samukh district was created in addition to Khanlar district in February 1992. The names of the district and its centre were changed again in 2008 according to the Presidential Decree dated 7 May 2008 and have been called Goygol district and Goygol city respectively.

Access to the southern portions of the rayon is restricted due to its proximity to Nagorno-Karabakh and the armistice line there.

Geography

Location 
Goygol district is located on the mountainous and foothill zone in the west of Azerbaijan, 364 km away from Baku. Its highest point is 3724 metres above the sea level. Goygol raion borders on administrative districts of Samukh to the north, Goranboy to the east, Kalbajar to the south, Dashkasan to the west, Shamkir to the north-west and Ganja city to the north. It has an area of 920  km2 and population of 63,400.

Climate

Administrative divisions 
There are 27 administrative territorial units in Goygol district including a city (Goygol city), 5 towns (Khanlar, Gizilgaya, Hajimelik, Ashaghi Zurnabad and Firuzabad) and 39 villages such as Balchili, Gushgara, Chayli, Mollajalilli, and Topalhasanli.

Culture 
There are 15 cultural centers, 15 cultural clubs, 41 libraries, 2 music schools (in Goygol city and Khagani village), 2 museums – Heydar Aliyev Museum Center and History and Ethnography Museum, as well as 3 parks in the Goygol district.

There are a number of historical buildings in the district, such as the castle in the south of Zurnabad village dates to the 12th century, the sepulcher dates to the 16th century in Gushgara village, Anaid Temple (16th century) and St. Mary church in Chaykend village, German Lutheran church (1854-1857) in Goygol city, Gabriel Church (1674) and others.

Sport 
There is Goygol Olympic Sports Complex opened in January 2014, Goygol Central City Stadium and other sporting facilities in Goygol.

Infrastructure 
There are 5 bridges in the district: Agh bridge dates to 12th century in Topalhasanli village on Ganjachay river, Birgozlu and Ikigozlu bridges date to the 16th century in Dozular village and in Goygol city on Kurekchay river and Ganjachay river respectively, Uchgozlu bridge dates to 1896 in Uchtepe village on Ganjachay and Stone bridge with two arches on Ganjachay.

Nature 

Goygol and 7 identical lakes – Maralgol, Zaligol, Aghgol, Shamligol, Ordekgol, Jeyrangol and Garagol are located in the territory of Goygol district. Lake Goygol is situated on the foothill of Mount Kapaz at an altitude of 1556 meters. The length of the lake is 2450 meters, and its width is 595 meters, the deepest point is 95 meters.

Maralgol is located 1902 meters above the sea level. It has an area of 23 hectares with the deepest point of 60 meters. The lake is surrounded with sub-alpine grasslands.

The main rivers flowing through the district are Kurekchay, Ganjachay and Goshgarchay. Kurekchay river is the longest with 108 km length. The second longest river is Ganjachay with 98 kilometers length. The rivers are mainly used for irrigation. Water level in the rivers increases during summer.

Flora 
The forests rich with Oriental beech, Caucasian Hornbeam, Caucasian oak and Oriental oak trees cover 17.3% of the territory of the Goygol district. There are separate or mixed forests on various slopes of mountainous areas. Horn-beam in southern slopes, beech, beech-hornbeam in northern slopes, Caucasian and Oriental oaks, also oak-hornbeam in the upper forest zone are in abundance. Pine trees grow on limestone rocks. There are also birches in upper areas of forests and different types of other trees and shrubs such rosa canina, honeysuckles, sorbus, raspberries, crataegus, euonymus, cherry plum in the lower parts of forests.

Goygol National Park 

Goygol National Park was founded in April, 2008 on the base of Goygol State Nature Reserve established in 1925, in the territories of administrative raions of Goygol, Goranboy and Dashkasan.

Goygol National Park is located at an altitude between 1100 and 3065 meters. It has a total of 12755 hectares area including 6739 hectares of Goygol State Reserve, 1577 hectares forests, 3909 hectares of Goygol district, 300 hectares of Dashkasan district and 230 hectares of Goranboy district.

There are 76 types of trees and shrubs in the forest of Goygol National Park including Oriental beech, Oriental oak, Caucasian hornbeam, hook-shaped pines, birchs, maples, cornelian cherry, elderberry, blackberry, rosa canina, common hazel and medlar. The fauna of the National park is diverse with Caucasian deer, roe deer, badger, forest cat, sable, lynx, hare, squirrel, fox, hedgehog, grey partridge and others.

Minerals 
There are pyrites, uranium, marble, limestone, and mineral water in the territory of the Goygol district.

References

External links 

 
Districts of Azerbaijan